Ernest Tubb and His Texas Troubadours is an album by American country singer Ernest Tubb, released in 1960.

Track listing
"Yellow Rose of Texas" (Don George)
"I'll Step Aside" (Johnny Bond)
"Drivin' Nails in My Coffin" (Gerald Irby)
"Till We Two Are One" (Tom Glazer, Billy Martin, Larry Martin)
"Jealous Loving Heart" (Ernest Tubb)
"Kansas City Blues" (Ernest Tubb)
"Don't Forbid Me" (Charles Singleton)
"Two Glasses Joe" (Cindy Walker)
"Journey's End" (E. Tubb, Henry Stewart) 
"It's a Lonely World (E. Tubb, Redd Stewart)
"You Don't Have To Be A Baby To Cry (Merrill Shand) 
"There's a Little Bit of Everything in Texas" (E. Tubb)

Personnel
Ernest Tubb – vocals, guitar
Billy Byrd – guitar
Leon Rhodes – lead guitar (1960-1967)
Cal Smith – rhythm guitar (1961-1967)
Steve Chapman – lead guitar (1967-)
Grady Martin – guitar
Buddy Emmons – pedal steel guitar, guitar (1960-1961)
Buddy Charleton – pedal steel guitar (1962-1967)
Dickie Harris – pedal steel guitar
Jack Drake – bass
Farris Coursey – drums
Buddy Harman – drums
Jack Greene –  drums (1962-1965)
Floyd Cramer – piano
Owen Bradley – piano
Dale Potter – fiddle
Tommy Jackson – fiddle
 Pete Mitchell - Guitar

References

  

Ernest Tubb albums
1960 albums
Albums produced by Owen Bradley
Vocalion Records albums
Albums produced by Paul Cohen (record producer)